Youel may refer to:

 Jim Youel, an American football player
 Curtis Youel, an American sports coach
 Youel (Gnosticism), an angel in Gnosticism